Richard Anthony Rosenthal (born January 20, 1933) is a former American National Basketball Association (NBA) forward with the Fort Wayne Pistons.  He played collegiate basketball for the Notre Dame men's basketball team, where he averaged 16.4 points per game over his career. Rosenthal also played baseball at Notre Dame in 1952 and 1953. The Pistons drafted him in the first round of the 1954 NBA draft.  He played parts of two seasons for the Pistons, appearing in 85 career games and averaging 6.8 points per game in his NBA career.

Rosenthal became president of St. Joseph Bank and Trust Co. in South Bend, Indiana. In 1987 he succeeded Gene Corrigan as the athletic director of Notre Dame, during which time the 1988 football team won the national championship. Rosenthal retired from the position in 1994, after the university entered the Big East Conference.

References

1930 births
Living people
All-American college men's basketball players
American men's basketball players
Basketball players from St. Louis
Fort Wayne Pistons draft picks
Fort Wayne Pistons players
Notre Dame Fighting Irish athletic directors
Notre Dame Fighting Irish baseball players
Notre Dame Fighting Irish men's basketball players
Small forwards